Playa Azul (en: Blue Beach) is a beachside town in the Mexican State of Michoacán. The city lives from tourism and fishing.
The city was featured in the 2021 racing game Forza Horizon 5

References

Populated places in Michoacán
Port cities and towns on the Mexican Pacific coast